Woolmer is a rural locality in the Toowoomba Region, Queensland, Australia.

References 

Toowoomba Region
Localities in Queensland